Irwin D. Mandel (April 9, 1922, in Brooklyn – May 26, 2011, in Montclair, New Jersey) was an American biochemist and dentist who was known for his research on the biochemistry of saliva. He was a founder of the preventive dentistry movement and established the first department of preventive dentistry at an American university, the Columbia University College of Dental Medicine. In 1985 he became the first recipient of the Gold Medal for Excellence in Dental Research by the American Dental Association.

References

1922 births
2011 deaths
American biochemists
American dentists
People from Brooklyn
Columbia University faculty
American dentistry academics
Scientists from New York (state)
20th-century dentists